Paul Rose (birth unknown) is an English former professional rugby league footballer who played in the 1960s, 1970s and 1980s.

Playing career
Paul Rose has lived in Leek, Staffordshire since .

International honours
Paul Rose won caps for England while at the Hull Kingston Rovers in 1977 against France, in 1978 against Wales, and won caps for Great Britain while at the Hull Kingston Rovers in 1974 against Australia (sub), in 1978 against Australia, and Australia (sub) (2 matches), and while at Hull in 1982 against Australia.

Challenge Cup Final appearances
Paul Rose played left-, i.e. number 11, in the Hull Kingston Rovers' 10–5 victory over Hull F.C. in the 1979–80 Challenge Cup Final during the 1979–80 season at Wembley Stadium, London on Saturday 3 May 1980, in front of a crowd of 95,000, played left-, and received a 10-minute sin-bin following an illegal high-tackle on John Gilbert in Hull FC's 14–12 defeat by Featherstone Rovers in the 1982–83 Challenge Cup Final during the 1982–83 season at Wembley Stadium, London on Saturday 7 May 1983, in front of a crowd of 84,969, and played right-, i.e. number 12, in the 24–28 defeat by Wigan in the 1984–85 Challenge Cup Final during the 1984–85 season at Wembley Stadium, London on Saturday 4 May 1985, in front of a crowd of 99,801, in what is regarded as the most marvellous cup final in living memory, which Hull narrowly lost after fighting back from 12–22 down at half-time.

County Cup Final appearances
Paul Rose played right-, i.e. number 10, in the Hull Kingston Rovers' 16–13 victory over Wakefield Trinity in the 1974–75 Yorkshire County Cup Final during the 1974–75 season at Headingley Rugby Stadium, Leeds on Saturday 26 October 1974, played left-, i.e. number 11, in the 11–15 defeat by Leeds in the 1975–76 Yorkshire County Cup Final during the 1975–76 season at Headingley Rugby Stadium, Leeds on Saturday 15 November 1975, played as an interchange/substitute, i.e. number 15, (replacing  Steve Crooks) in the 7–8 defeat by Leeds in the 1980–81 Yorkshire County Cup Final during the 1980–81 season at Fartown Ground, Huddersfield on Saturday 8 November 1980, played left-, i.e. number 11, and scored 2-tries in Hull FC's 18–7 victory over Bradford Northern in the 1982–83 Yorkshire County Cup Final during the 1982–83 season at Elland Road, Leeds on Saturday 2 October 1982, and was an interchange/substitute, i.e. number 14, in the 29–12 victory over the Hull Kingston Rovers in the 1984–85 Yorkshire County Cup Final during the 1984–85 season at Boothferry Park, Kingston upon Hull on Saturday 27 October 1984.

BBC2 Floodlit Trophy Final appearances
Paul Rose played right-, i.e. number 12, and scored a try in the Hull Kingston Rovers' 26–11 victory over St. Helens in the 1977–78 BBC2 Floodlit Trophy Final at Craven Park, Hull on Tuesday 13 December 1977.

John Player Special Trophy Final appearances
Paul Rose played right-, i.e. number 10, in Hull FC's 0–12 defeat by the Hull Kingston Rovers in the 1984–85 John Player Special Trophy Final during the 1984–85 season at Boothferry Park, Kingston upon Hull on Saturday 26 January 1985.

Illawarra Rugby League First Grade Grand Final appearances
Paul Rose played right-, i.e. number 10, in the Dapto Canaries 18–5 victory over the Port Kembla Blacks in the Illawarra Rugby League First Grade Grand Final at Wollongong Showground, Wollongong on Sunday 18 September 1977, in front of a crowd of 12,641.

Testimonial match
Paul Rose's Testimonial match at the Hull Kingston Rovers took place in 1980.

Genealogical information
Paul Rose is related to the rugby league  or  who played in the 2000s for the Hull Kingston Rovers (Heritage No.) (2002–03), Collegians (in Wollongong, Australia), the York City Knights (2006) and the Rochdale Hornets (2007); Mark Blanchard.

References

External links
 (archived by web.archive.org) Stats → Past Players → R at hullfc.com
 (archived by web.archive.org) Statistics at hullfc.com
Photograph "No way through for Van Bellen – Ian Van Bellen falls to a double tackle – Date: 04/03/1979" at rlhp.co.uk

Living people
England national rugby league team players
English rugby league players
Great Britain national rugby league team players
Hull F.C. players
Hull Kingston Rovers players
Place of birth missing (living people)
Rugby league props
Rugby league second-rows
Year of birth missing (living people)
Yorkshire rugby league team players